Iskandar or Eskandar also Iskander, Skandar, or Scandar is a given name and a surname.

Iskandar or Eskandar or their variances may also refer to:

Places
 Iskandar Malaysia, the new main southern development corridor in Johor, Malaysia
 Iskandar (town), Tashkent Region, Uzbekistan
 Iskandar Airport, a military airport in Pangkalan Bun, Central Kalimantan, Indonesia

Iran
 Eskandar, Iran, a village in Sistan and Baluchestan Province
 Eskandar, East Azerbaijan, a village in East Azerbaijan Province
 Eskandar, South Khorasan, a village in South Khorasan Province

Other uses
 9K720 Iskander, a Russian ballistic missile
 Iskandar (film), a 2003 film

See also
 Iskanderkul, an alpine lake located in the Fann Mountains of Tajikistan
 Iscandar, a fictional planet in Space Battleship Yamato a.k.a. Star Blazers
 List of Fate/Zero characters
 Sikandar (disambiguation)
 İskender (disambiguation)
 Eskandari (disambiguation)